This is a list of ancient Greeks in Thrace

Ancient

Artists
Brygos Attic Painter/Potter (possibly of Thracian origin)
Athenion of Maroneia Painter 
Boethus of Chalcedon Sculptor

Athletes
_of Maroneia  Pale Greek Wrestling Olympics 476 BC

Grammarians
Aristarchus of Samothrace 
Aristophanes of Byzantium 
Dionysius Thrax

Historians
Thucydides 
Hecataeus of Abdera 
Stephanus of Byzantium  
Hieronymus of Cardia

Mathematicians
Bion of Abdera 
Philo of Byzantium 
Epigenes of Byzantium

Mythic Lovers
Hero and Leander

Philosophers
Leucippus 
Protagoras
Diogenes Apolloniates 
Thrasymachus 
Democritus 
Xenocrates 
Anaxarchus  
Hecataeus of Abdera 
Hipparchia of Maroneia 
Metrocles 
Antisthenes of Athens

Physicians
Herodicus

Poets
Nicaenetus of Samos 
Sotades of Maroneia 
Phaedimus of Bisanthe

Rulers-Politicians
Miltiades the Elder
Miltiades 
Cimon 
Themistocles
Cleophon (politician) 
Thucydides 
Nymphodorus of Abdera 
Python of Aenus 
Heraclides of Aenus
Eumenes 
Lysimachus 
Agathocles (son of Lysimachus)

Hellenized Thracians
Dolonci (Δόλογγες)
Abrotonum 
Hegesipyle of Olorus
Olorus 
List of rulers of Bithynia

Cities

Aegean Thrace

In order from west to east:

Stryme
Abdera
Ismaros
Maroneia 
Samothrace 
Aenus 
Lysimachia

Thracian Chersonese

Abydos, Hellespont 
Alopeconnesus 
Aegospotami
Callipolis
Cardia 
Elaeus 
Sestus

Propontis

Bisanthe 
Perinthus 
Selymbria

Bosporus

Byzantium 
Chalcedon

Pontus Euxinus

In order from north to south:

Histria 
Tomi 
Callatis 
Dionysopolis or Krounoi 
Odessos or Odessopolis 
Naulochos 
Mesembria 
Anchialos 
Apollonia 
Agathopolis

References

External links
Map of Greek Colonies in Thrace

Ancient Thracian Greeks
Thrace
Thracian Greeks